The Hudson River–Black River Regulating District (HRBRRD) is a New York state public-benefit corporation that traces its formation to the creation of the Black River Regulating District in 1919, and the Hudson River Regulating District in 1922 in response to the severe historical flooding of the cities of Albany, Green Island, Rensselaer, Troy, and Watervliet by the Sacandaga River and Hudson River and its tributaries. The HRBRRD, formed in 1959 by combining the two entities, collects excess runoff to reduce flooding impacts in the Hudson River and Black River basins, and releases this captured water gradually during periods of low river flow to maintain water quality in each river basin. This system was designed to reduce damage from spring storms and snowmelt, including disease and destruction of life and property, and to improve river navigation and public sanitation. The HRBRRD was also formed with hydroelectric generation in mind. It owns and operates several dams—including the Conklingville Dam which formed the Great Sacandaga Lake—and reservoirs.

Organization
The HRBRRD is guided by a 7-member board. Its management team is headed by Executive Director John C. Callaghan, Sr. In 2017, it had operating expenses of $8.53 million, no outstanding debt, and a staffing level of 24 people.

For decades, HRBRRD's revenues came from lease agreements with electrical power companies who operate the hydroelectric generation facilities within the district, however these revenues ended in 2009 because of a lawsuit. The HRBRRD then tried to obtain revenue from the counties to which it provided flood relief, i.e., Warren, Washington, Saratoga, Rensselaer, and Albany and a lawsuit was filed in response. The HRBRRD now receives revenue from Brookfield Renewable Power in the amount of $1.4 million per year (with an annual 3 percent increase), from permit fees charged to land owners along the shoreline of the Great Sacandaga Lake in the amount of $412,000 per year, and from dam maintenance fees received from the hydroelectric facilities in an annual amount of $471,000. After those three sources of revenue are accounted for, the remaining operating expenses and debt are paid for by the HRBRRD's benefiting county governments based upon assessed property value along the river system.

Facilities
The HRBRRD owns and operates six dams and their accompanying reservoirs. These facilities include:
Conklingville Dam on the Sacandaga River, a Hudson River tributary
Indian Lake on the Indian River, a Hudson River tributary
Stillwater Reservoir on the Beaver River, a Black River tributary
The Fulton Chain of Lakes, with dams at Old Forge and Sixth Lake, which are the headwaters of the Middle Branch of the Moose River, a Black River tributary

The dams are inspected annually by the Federal Energy Regulatory Commission.

See also

 Adirondack Park Agency
 Albany Port District Commission
 Development Authority of the North Country
 North Country (New York)
 Olympic Regional Development Authority
 Upstate New York

References

External links
HRBRRD Website
Development Authority of the North Country Website
NYS Office of the State Comptroller's list of NYS Public Benefit Corporations
NYS Authorities Budget Office list of NYS Public Benefit Corporations

Regions of New York (state)
Upstate New York
Politics of New York (state)
Public benefit corporations